Jean Heather (February 21, 1921 – October 29, 1995 ) was an American actress who appeared in eight feature films during the 1940s.

Early years 
Heather was the only child of Dewey and Florence Heatherington. She was born in Omaha. After she and her parents moved to Oakland, California, she graduated from Oakland High School. She began her collegiate studies at the University of California at Berkeley before studying at Oregon State University, 1940 to 1941. She transferred to the University of Washington in 1942. She was an initiate of the Alpha Theta chapter of Alpha Delta Pi at the University of Washington.

Career 
Following her college graduation, Heather signed a contract with Paramount. She acted in two Oscar-nominated movies in 1944: the crime drama Double Indemnity, in which she played Lola Dietrichson, a young woman convinced that her stepmother Phyllis (Barbara Stanwyck) is responsible for the murder of her father, and Going My Way, where she played a runaway teenager assisted by Father O'Malley (Bing Crosby).

Heather's acting career was cut short by an automobile accident in December 1947, in which she was thrown from her car onto the pavement and suffered severe facial lacerations.

Personal life and death 
Heather married United States Military Academy graduate Arthur Ferdinand Meier on July 5, 1944, in Glendale, California. Meier later became a corporate executive. After 41 years of marriage, Meier died in 1985 from pulmonary disease. Heather died ten years later. Both were cremated and their ashes scattered in the Pacific Ocean.

Filmography

References

External links
 
 
 

1921 births
1995 deaths
Actresses from Omaha, Nebraska
American film actresses
American television actresses
20th-century American actresses
Oregon State University alumni
University of Washington alumni
Paramount Pictures contract players